Itay Tiran (born March 23, 1980) is an Israeli stage and screen actor, director, and a well-known pro-Palestinian advocate in Israel. As an actor, he is known for his roles in Forgiveness (2006), Beaufort (2007), The Debt (2007), Homeland (2008), Lebanon (2009), The Promise (2011),  (2012), Die Lebenden (2012), Lauf, Junge, lauf (2013) and Demon.

Early life
Tiran was born and raised in Petah Tikva, Israel, to an Ashkenazi Jewish family. His father Raffi is a graphics designer who emigrated from Hungary and his mother Monica is an accountant who emigrated to Israel from Sweden. His maternal grandmother Deborah survived Auschwitz. Itay is one of four boys, his youngest brother Alon Tiran is an up-and-coming Theater director. Itay studied classical piano in the Petah Tikva Municipal conservatory and later majored in music at Thelma Yellin High School of the Arts. He was exempted from conscription into the Israel Defense Forces for mental health reasons. In 1999 he enrolled in the Beit Zvi Acting School, where his talent was immediately recognized. He paid his way through school winning scholarship after scholarship. His roles as a third-year student included Mozart in Amadeus, Nero in Britannicus, King Richard in Richard II and Berger in the musical Hair.

Theater career
Upon completing his studies Tiran joined the Cameri Theater in Tel Aviv. Among his parts were Eilif  in Mother Courage, Franz Jägerstätter in Yehoshua Sobol's Eye Witness (directed by Paulus Manker), Nicolah in Caviar and Lentils, the title role in Hamlet directed by Omri Nitzan, Christian in Festen, Mozart in Amadeus and King in Rumpelstiltskin. In March 2007, Itay received rave reviews from audiences and media in Washington, D.C., for his performance as Hamlet in the Tel Aviv Cameri Theater production's world tour.  The "Israeli Hamlet" performed in Shanghai, Cleveland, Gdańsk, Bucharest and Moscow. In 2010, Itay played Kittel in Yehoshua Sobol's Ghetto followed by a remarkable directing debut with Georg Büchner's Woyzeck in which he also played the title role. Tiran's Woyzeck was embraced by the critiques making him a theater director to reckon with. In late 2011 the Cameri Theater's production of Cabaret featured a dark, scary MC portrayed by Itay Tiran which ultimately won him the Best Actor Award at the 2011 Israeli Theater Awards. In July 2012 the Cameri Theater staged a special project, William Shakespeare's Richard II and Richard III, directed by Arthur Kogan with Tiran in both title roles. The project was a huge critical and commercial success. Tiran's virtuosic performance abilities were awarded at the 2012 Israeli Theater Awards when he won Best Actor for Richard III. The Cameri's "Richards" Project won 7 Awards including Best Director, Best Supporting Actor, Best Play. In the summer of 2013 Tiran adapted the book Little Man, What Now? by Hans Fallada. The play, beautifully directed, earned him huge critical acclaim as a Theater Director, the paper Haaretz even called Tiran the Laurence Olivier of Israeli theater. Tiran's Woyzeck went to the Büchner Festival in Wiesbaden/Germany in the spring of 2013, opening to rave reviews. It was announced that Tiran is to play the title role in the play Cyrano de Bergerac by Edmond Rostand in late 2013. In 2019 Tiran plays the title role in Shakespeare's Othello at the Staatstheater Stuttgart

Film career
Itay Tiran has played leading roles in award-winning films such as: Forgiveness, presented at the Berlin International Film Festival in 2006; Beaufort, which won the Silver Bear Award for Best Director at the Berlin International Film Festival in 2007 and was later nominated for an Oscar in the Best Foreign Language Category for 2008; and Lebanon, which won the Golden Lion Award at the 66th Venice Film Festival in 2009 and the Discovery Award at the European Film Awards in 2010.
In 2011 the UK Channel 4 screened Peter Kosminsky's mini series The Promise. Tiran played Paul, an ex-soldier turned Leftist. 2012 was an interesting year for Tiran, he played Thomas Paulson a photographer with dog in the German film production of  directed by Sherry Hormann and Jocquin an Israeli photographer in the Austrian film Die Lebenden directed by Barbara Albert.

Personal life
Tiran met German-born Israeli singer and actress Melanie Peres in 2007. They were married by Udi Aloni in Shulamit Aloni's garden on October 31, 2008. They resided in Sitria.

Tiran is a radical left advocate in Israel, pro-Palestinian, and endorses the BDS movement; promoting various forms of boycott against Israel. He also believes that, "Zionism is Racism".

Filmography

Awards and scholarships
His performances have gained him various awards and nominations in Israeli theater and film, winning the award for Most Promising Actor in Israel Theater in 2003,  Best Actor in 2005 for his  performance as Hamlet in the Israeli Cameri Theater production of the Shakespeare play;  Best Supporting Actor for his role as Wolfgang Amadeus Mozart in Amadeus at the 2009 Israel Theater Awards. Itay was nominated for Best Actor at the Israeli Film Academy Awards for his roles in Forgiveness and The Debt. In 2009 Tiran collaborated with world-renowned German conductor Kurt Masur in Mendelssohn's Midsummer Night's Dream. They performed together with the Israel Philharmonic Orchestra in Tel Aviv moving on to Paris to perform with the Orchestre National de France at the St. Denis Festival and at the Musée d'Orsay. In 2009 Tiran joined the Gropius Ensemble, formed by young conductor Daniel Cohen combining modern classical music and theatrical elements, performing pieces like Kafka's Kofadam and A Soldier's Tale by Stravinsky. Tiran's directing debut (2010) with Georg Büchner's Woyzeck in which he also played the title role, earned him a well-deserved critical acclaim as a theater director. In March 2011 Tiran and Kurt Masur met again, this time in the Davis Symphony Hall  of San Francisco together with the San Francisco Symphony for the performance of A Midsummer Night's Dream.
The San Francisco Chronicle called Tiran's impersonations "relevant and virtuosic".

References

External links
 
 Itay Tiran at E-Online 
 The Gropius Ensemble
 
 
 
 
 
 
 
 Offizielle Webseite
 

1980 births
Israeli male film actors
Jewish Israeli male actors
Living people
Israeli people of Hungarian-Jewish descent
Israeli people of Swedish-Jewish descent
People from Petah Tikva
Israeli Ashkenazi Jews
Far-left politics in Israel
Beit Zvi School for the Performing Arts alumni
Jewish anti-Zionism in Israel
Anti-Zionist Jews
Israeli emigrants to Germany
Thelma Yellin High School of Arts alumni